Mohamed Islam Bakir (born July 13, 1996 in Larbaâ) is an Algerian footballer who plays for CR Belouizdad in the Algerian Ligue Professionnelle 1.

Club career
In June 2016, Bakir signed a three-year contract with ES Sétif.

References

External links
 

1996 births
Algeria under-23 international footballers
Algeria youth international footballers
Algerian footballers
Algerian expatriate footballers
Living people
People from Blida Province
Algerian Ligue Professionnelle 1 players
Tunisian Ligue Professionnelle 1 players
RC Arbaâ players
ES Sétif players
CS Sfaxien players
Association football wingers
Algerian expatriate sportspeople in Tunisia
Expatriate footballers in Tunisia
21st-century Algerian people
CR Belouizdad players
Algeria A' international footballers
2022 African Nations Championship players